Children of the Underground is a five episode documentary series from FX on Faye Yager and the underground network she created to assist mothers of sexually abused children to relocate and to hide from their abusers. Yager was inspired to found the organization after losing custody of her daughter to her husband, pedophile Roger Lee Jones. Jones later became the first FBI most wanted fugitive to flee child molestation charges and was later captured at a campground.

The series features Yager, her daughter, Gloria Steinem, Sally Jessy Raphael, and others. Episode one explains the historical context, the role of daytime television in lifting up the voices of women and the issues they faced, and introduces the network and its issues with law enforcement. Episode two shares the story of Yager's own criminal trial and her daughter's experience. It chronicles Yager's libel suit after heckling psychologist Lawrence D. Spiegel on the Geraldo talk show and decreased reliance on medical evidence before assisting fugitive mothers. Episode three shows increased belief in Satanic rituals in child abuse cases. Episode four continues the conflicts from critics and the press. Episode five concludes with a major lawsuit against the organization.

References

Documentary series